Allion Healthcare was the parent company of MOMSpharmacy based in Melville, New York primarily known for providing mail order HIV medications to patients who are primarily on Medicaid or the AIDS Drug Assistance Program (ADAP).

Among the offerings is the MOMSPak in which the drugs are packed together in dated individual packages to make the multi-drug regimen easier.

The company reported having 15,610 patients in 2007.

The company has distribution centers in New York, California, Florida, New Jersey, and Washington.

History
The company was founded in 1983 as The Care Group and changed its name to Allion in 1999 after emerging from bankruptcy.

The company has an agreement with Roche Laboratories for pricing discounts in exchange for providing blind patient data on Fuzeon medication. In November 2007 Company signed an exclusive distribution agreement with Galea Life Sciences for Nutraplete, the first therapeutic dietary supplement designed specifically for people living with HIV/AIDS.

The company was listed on NASDAQ on the ticker symbol ALLI.  On January 13, 2010, the company closed on being acquired by the private equity firm HIG Capital for $6.60/share in a deal valued at $278 million.

2012 indictment
On April 4, 2012, the New York Attorney General Eric T. Schneiderman charged four people associated with the company in a Money Laundering & Bribery Scheme claiming the company sold blackmarket drugs "of unknown origin and potency, and in some cases, drugs that were mislabeled or potentially expired."  According to the complaint: To date none of such has been proven.

In September 2008, Glenn Schabel, the supervising pharmacist and compliance officer for Allion, began ordering in excess of $274 million worth of alleged black market HIV medications from various licensed wholesalers over  a 4 year period as directed by executive management. The Attorney General claimed such medications were obtained by various illegal means and the batches may have included unused pills that had previously been dispensed to individuals, medications stolen from manufacturers, or drugs that had expired, even though they were provided in legitimate manufacturers bottles. None of these claims have been proven to date even after hundreds of bottles were analyzed. The wholesalers  were controlled by Stephen Manuel Costa, a 27-year-old Florida resident who incorporated four separate entities as licensed “wholesale” distributors, allegedly in order to disguise the sale of the diverted medications. It is also alleged that Costa furnished millions of the black market HIV medications to various entities including MOMS who dispensed the medications to their patients, many of whom were Medicaid recipients. Allion, under the direction of corporate management, continued to bill Medicaid, claiming no knowledge that the drugs were purchased illegally.

Attorney General Schneiderman’s investigation also revealed that Ira Gross, another licensed pharmacist, brokered the sale of the alleged illegally diverted drugs between Allion and Costa. The fourth defendant, Harry Abolafia, created false invoices for Costa’s companies—SMC Distributors, Fidelity Wholesale, Optimus Wholesale, and Nuline Pharmaceuticals—in order to make the transactions appear to be legitimate. In total, on behalf of Allion, Schabel ordered $274 million worth of alleged black market HIV medications from Costa's licensed wholesalers.

The indictment said at least $155 million in false claims were associated with the charge.

References

External links
 Momspharmacy.com
 allionhealthcare.com

American companies established in 1983
Health care companies established in 1983
Companies that filed for Chapter 11 bankruptcy in 1999
HIV/AIDS in the United States
Medicare and Medicaid (United States)
Companies based in Suffolk County, New York
Pharmacy benefit management companies based in the United States
Health care companies based in New York (state)
1983 establishments in New York (state)
Companies formerly listed on the Nasdaq
2010 mergers and acquisitions
Specialty drugs
Private equity portfolio companies